Raypower is a group of independent private Nigerian radio stations broadcasting in multiple cities nationwide, including on the 100.5 FM frequency from Abuja and Lagos.

History 
In the wake of deregulation of broadcasting on 24 August 1992, DAAR Communications Plc, founded by Raymond Dokpesi, applied for and was granted approval to operate an independent radio station. The station which started test transmission on 15 December 1993 made history on 1 September 1994 when it commenced commercial broadcasting with the launch of Raypower 100.5 fm in Lagos as the first 24-hour broadcast service station in Nigeria as well as the first private independent broadcasting station in the country. The Abuja station launched on 1 January 2005.

In June 2019, the National Broadcasting Commission shut down Raypower and its sister television channel, Africa Independent Television; Dokpesi, an opposition figure, claimed his stations were being targeted and alleged licensing fees were too high. The commission said it forced their indefinite closure due to violations of broadcast codes and failure to meet other obligations to the regulator. It withdrew the suspension notice at the end of the month.

Stations

References

External links 
Raypower website

Radio stations in Nigeria
Radio stations established in 1994
Mass media in Abuja
1994 establishments in Nigeria
Radio stations in Lagos